The pygmy blue whale (Balaenoptera musculus brevicauda) is a subspecies of the blue whale (Balaenoptera musculus) found in the Indian Ocean and the Southern Pacific Ocean.

Reaching lengths of up to 24 metres (79 ft) it is smaller than the other commonly recognized subspecies, B. m. musculus and B. m. intermedia, the former reaching 28 m (92 ft) and the latter 30 m (98 ft), hence its common name.

The pygmy blue whale is the only one of the three identifiable subspecies to be found regularly in tropical waters. It occurs from the sub-Antarctic zone to the southern Indian Ocean and southwestern Pacific Ocean, breeding in the Indian and South Atlantic oceans, and travelling south to above the Antarctic to feed, although they very rarely cross the Antarctic Convergence.

A fourth subspecies, B. m. indica, was identified by Blyth in 1859 in the northern Indian Ocean, but difficulties in identifying distinguishing features for this subspecies lead to it being used a synonym for B. m. musculus. It is now thought to be the same subspecies as the pygmy blue whale. Records for Soviet catches seem to indicate the female adult size is closer to that of the pygmy blue than B. m. musculus, although the populations of B. m. indica and B. m. brevicauda appear to be discrete, and the breeding seasons differ by almost six months.

Pygmy blue whales are believed to be more numerous than the other subspecies, possibly making up half of all blue whales alive today.
Although the designation is widely accepted, because of the relatively healthy stocks of pygmy blues compared to the other subspecies, The Committee on the Status of Endangered Wildlife in Canada has questioned whether the subclassification of the pygmy blue whale has been driven by the interests of the whaling industry.

Physical characteristics 

According to observations made since the subspecies was first described in 1966, the pygmy blue whale differs from the "true" blue whales in a number of physical characteristics. It has:
broader and shorter baleen plates,
a shorter tail, and hence a proportionately longer body in front of the dorsal fin,
a larger head relative to body size, and,
a heavier body weight compared to other blue whales of the same length.

Pygmy blue whales reach sexual maturity at 10 years of age and a length of 19.2 meters (63 feet), weighing on average 52.5 tonnes (58 tons). As adults, males average 21.1 meters (69 feet) and females 21.9 meters (72 feet), with most probably between 20.7 and 22.5 meters (68 and 74 feet). The calculated average weight is 75.5 tonnes (83.5 tons) for males and 90 tonnes (99 tons) for females. A whale at the maximum known size of 24 meters (79 feet) would weigh in the range of 129.5 tonnes (143 tons).

The shorter tail gives the pygmy blue whale more of a tadpole-like shape, and reflects in differences in diving behavior: whereas in the "true" blues, there is a delay between the submergence of the dorsal fin and the caudal peduncle; in pygmy blue whales, the dorsal and peduncle submerge simultaneously. Pygmy blue whales also tend to be darker than the other subspecies of blue whales, and the shape of their blowhole is different.

Evolutionary history 

The pygmy blue whale formed from a founder group of Antarctic blue whales about 20,000 years ago, around the Last Glacial Maximum. This is likely because blue whales were driven north by expanding ice, and some have stayed there ever since. The pygmy blue whale's evolutionarily recent origins cause it to have a relatively low genetic diversity.

Specimens 

MNZ MM002191, collected Motutapu Island, Hauraki Gulf, New Zealand, September 1994, now in Te Papa collection.
Skull, collected in New Caledonia, now at Maritime Museum of New Caledonia.

Conservation status 

The pygmy blue whale is covered by the Memorandum of Understanding for the Conservation of Cetaceans and Their Habitats in the Pacific Islands Region (Pacific Cetaceans MOU).

A new population of pygmy blue whales was discovered in the Indian Ocean in 2017, with the aid of nuclear bomb detectors. The Chagos population was determined to be undiscovered before by their unique song.

References

External links 

 Official webpage of the Memorandum of Understanding for the Conservation of Cetaceans and Their Habitats in the Pacific Islands Region

Baleen whales
Blue whales
Cetaceans of the Indian Ocean
Cetaceans of the Pacific Ocean
Mammals of Asia
Mammals of Oceania